Fonchiiichthys uracanthus is a species of armored catfish native to Costa Rica and Panama.  This species is the only member of its genus.  However, Fonchiiichthys has recently been considered to be a synonym of Rineloricaria and thus may be invalid.  This species grows to a length of  SL.

References

Ferraris, C.J. Jr., 2003. Loricariidae - Loricariinae (Armored catfishes). p. 330-350. In R.E. Reis, S.O. Kullander and C.J. Ferraris, Jr. (eds.) Checklist of the Freshwater Fishes of South and Central America. Porto Alegre EDIPUCRS, Brasil.

Loricariidae
Fish described in 1863
Fish of Central America
Fish of Panama
Fish of Costa Rica
Monotypic freshwater fish genera
Taxa named by Isaäc J. H. Isbrücker
Taxa named by J. Pieter Michels
Catfish genera